The following lists events that happened during 1897 in South Africa.

Incumbents
 Governor of the Cape of Good Hope and High Commissioner for Southern Africa:Hercules Robinson then Alfred Milner.
 Governor of the Colony of Natal: Charles Bullen Hugh Mitchell.
 State President of the Orange Free State: Martinus Theunis Steyn.
 State President of the South African Republic: Paul Kruger.
 Prime Minister of the Cape of Good Hope: John Gordon Sprigg.
 Prime Minister of the Colony of Natal: 
 until 14 February: John Robinson.
 15 February – 4 October: Harry Escombe.
 starting 4 October: Henry Binns.

Events
April
 21 – Sir Alfred Milner becomes High Commissioner of South Africa and Governor of the Cape Colony.

May
 5 – Port Elizabeth is flooded.

December
 30 – The Colony of Natal annexes Zululand.

Unknown date
 Bergville is established in the foothills of the Drakensberg mountains in Natal.
 "Nkosi Sikelel' iAfrika" ("God Bless Africa") is composed as a Xhosa hymn by South African teacher Enoch Sontonga.

Births
 3 July – Ludwig Wybren Hiemstra, Afrikaans linguist and editor of the Bilingual Dictionary, is born in Lydenburg.
 26 October – James Leonard Brierley Smith, ichthyologist, is born in Graaff Reinet.

Deaths

Railways

Railway lines opened

 13 March – Cape Western – Mafeking to Ramatlabama at the Bechuanaland border, .
 3 August – Transvaal – Frederikstad to Klerksdorp, .
 1 October – Cape Midland – Rosmead Junction to Middelburg, .
 1 December – Natal – Isipingo to Park Rynie, .
 3 December – Natal – Verulam to Tongaat, .
 15 December – Natal – Thornville Junction to Richmond, .

Locomotives
Cape
Two new Cape gauge locomotive types enter service on the Cape Government Railways (CGR):
 Six 4th Class 4-4-2 Atlantic type tender locomotives on the section from Kimberley southwards.
 A third batch of fifty-five 6th Class 4-6-0 steam locomotives. In 1912 they would become Class 6B on the South African Railways.

Transvaal
 The independent Pretoria-Pietersburg Railway in the Zuid-Afrikaansche Republiek (Transvaal Republic) purchases a   tank locomotive named Portuguese from the Lourenco Marques, Delagoa Bay and East Africa Railway in Mozambique.
 Arthur Koppel, acting as agent, imports a number of Dickson-built 0-4-2ST narrow gauge saddle tank steam locomotives to mines on the Witwatersrand.

References

 
South Africa
Years in South Africa